The 2010 Copa Venezuela was the 41st staging of the Copa Venezuela.

The competition started on August 25, 2010 and concluded on December 8, 2010 with a two leg final, in which Trujillanos FC won the trophy for the second time with a 0–0 draw at home and a 1–1 draw away over Zamora FC.

First round
NB: Estrella Roja FC decline to take part.

The matches were played on 25–26 August 2010.

|}

Second round
The matches were played on 4–5 September 2010.

|}

Third round
The matches were played on 15 September–6 October 2010.

|}

Quarterfinals
The matches were played on 8 October–3 November 2010.

|}

Semifinals
The matches were played on 10–24 November 2010.

|}

Finals
The matches were played on 1–8 December 2010.

|}

Trujillanos FC qualify to Copa Sudamericana 2011.

Topscorers

External links
RSSSF.com
Soccerway.com

Copa Venezuela
2010 domestic association football cups
2010–11 in Venezuelan football